Scoparia vinotinctalis is a moth in the family Crambidae. It was described by George Hampson in 1896. It is found in India, where it has been recorded from the Nilgiri plateau.

References

Moths described in 1896
Scorparia
Moths of Asia